Bromus vulgaris is a species of brome grass known by the common name Columbia brome.

Distribution
It is native to western North America from British Columbia to California to Wyoming, where it grows in many types of habitat, including temperate coniferous forest.

Description
It is a perennial grass which may reach 1.1 meters in height. The inflorescence is an open array of spikelets, the lower ones drooping or nodding. The spikelets are flattened and have awns each up to a centimeter long at the tips of the fruits. This grass is considered a good forage for livestock and wild grazing animals.

External links
Jepson Manual Treatment
USDA Plants Profile
Forest Service Fire Ecology
Photo gallery

vulgaris
Bunchgrasses of North America
Native grasses of California
Flora of the Western United States
Grasses of the United States
Flora without expected TNC conservation status